Things Change may refer to:

Film and television
Things Change (film), a 1988 comedy and drama film directed by David Mamet 
"Things Change" (TMNT 2003 Episode), an episode of Teenage Mutant Ninja Turtles

Music
"Things Change" (Dwight Yoakam song), a song by Dwight Yoakam from the 1988 album A Long Way Home
"Things Change" (Petter Øien & Bobby Bare song), a song that competed to represent Norway in Eurovision 2012
"Things Change" (Keke Wyatt song), a short interlude track by Keke Wyatt on her 2016 album Rated Love
"Things Change" (Tim McGraw song), a song by Tim McGraw from the 2001 album Set This Circus Down

See also
The More Things Change (disambiguation)
"Things Have Changed", a 2000 song by Bob Dylan
"Things Have Changed" (Mattafix song), 2008